The Royal Air Force Rugby Union (RAFRU) was formed in 1918 to administer the playing of rugby union in the Royal Air Force. It fields a representative side that competes in the Inter-Services tournament with the Army Rugby Union and the Royal Navy Rugby Union.

History

The founding of the RAFRU relies much on the shoulders of William Wavell Wakefield. He joined the Royal Navy Air Service but on the formation of the Royal Air Force in April 1918 he transferred to them. He was one of the founders of the RAFRU; and in its early years a driving force:- he was a player, captaining the team; a selector; and the secretary of the RAFRU.

He played in 8 Inter-Service matches for the club, captaining the side in all the matches. His last two matches for RAFRU were particularly noteworthy.

The RAFRU played its first Inter-Service match at Twickenham Stadium on 14 February 1923. This was against the Royal Navy Rugby Union. They beat the Navy 3-0 in the match. Another Inter-Service match was organised against the Army Rugby Union on 10 March 1923, again at Twickenham, and again RAFRU were victorious, winning the match 13-5 and becoming Twickenham's Inter-Service champions at the first time of asking.

The RAF-Army match was Wakefield's last match as a player for RAFRU. That same year he was called up to the England squad.

100th Anniversary year

2018 became a notable year for the club as they beat both the Army and Navy sides, becoming Inter-Service Champions for the first time since 1994.

Womens side

The RAFRU run a womens side. They compete for the Molly Rose trophy with the womens navy side.

Veterans side

The veterans side is known as the Royal Air Force Vultures.

Notable former players

Scotland internationalists

The following former RAFRU players have represented Scotland at full international level.

  Angus Black
  William Steele
  Percy Friebe
  Jim Greenwood
  Norman Munnoch
  Roy Kinnear
  William Penman
  Keith Geddes

Wales internationalists

The following former RAFRU players have represented Wales at full international level.

  Willie Davies
  Bleddyn Williams
  Jeff Young
  Sian Williams

England internationalists

The following former RAFRU players have represented England at full international level.

  William Wakefield
  Don Rutherford
  Paul Hull
  Bob Weighill
  Peter Larter
  John Orwin
  Rory Underwood
  Peter Yarranton

Ireland internationalists

The following former RAFRU players have represented Ireland at full international level.

  George Beamish

References

1918 establishments in the United Kingdom
Military sport in the United Kingdom
Sports organizations established in 1918
Royal Air Force